"Who's That Girl?" is a song by British pop duo Eurythmics, released as the lead single from their third studio album, Touch (1983). It was written by band members Annie Lennox and David A. Stewart and produced by Stewart.

Reception
Cash Box called it a "real standout cut," saying it "features the group’s trademark ethereal musical textures and Annie Lennox’s unique vocal stylings."

The song became Eurythmics' third top-10 entry on the UK Singles Chart, peaking at number three. In the United States, "Who's That Girl?" was released as the second single from the album (following the top-10 single "Here Comes the Rain Again"), and reached number 21 on the Billboard Hot 100.

Music video

The music video for "Who's That Girl?" features Lennox in the role of a suspecting woman demanding to know with whom her lover has been seen associating. The video became a heavily played clip on MTV, and further showcased Lennox's gender-bending image. She appears as a nightclub singer performing the song (complete with 1960s-era blonde flip wig) and also as a male member of the audience akin to Elvis Presley (as seen on the cover of the single). At the end of the video, the female Lennox is shown kissing the male Lennox.

Stewart appears in the video, escorted by a number of different women played by a variety of guest stars including Cheryl Baker and Jay Aston of Bucks Fizz, Kiki Dee, Hazel O'Connor, Kate Garner of Haysi Fantayzee and all four members of Bananarama (including Stewart's future wife, Siobhan Fahey and future group member Jacquie O'Sullivan, who was a member of the band Shillelagh Sisters when the video was filmed, and who would replace Fahey in Bananarama in 1988). The gender-bending pop star Marilyn also makes an appearance in the video as another of Stewart's escorts. Despite the small role, Marilyn's appearance proved a high-profile move which helped lead to his own music career later the same year.

Track listings
7"
A: "Who's That Girl?" (Short Version) - 3:49
B: "You Take Some Lentils And You Take Some Rice" (Non-LP Track) - 3:03

12"
A: "Who's That Girl?" (Extended Version) - 6:58
B1: "You Take Some Lentils And You Take Some Rice" (Non-LP Track) - 3:03
B2: "ABC (Freeform)" (Non-LP Track) - 2:40

Charts

Weekly charts

Year-end charts

Cover versions
 The Flying Pickets recorded an a cappella version of the song. It was included on their 1988 compilation Best of The Flying Pickets.
 Australian chamber pop group Naked Raven included a cover of the song on their 2004 album Holding Our Breath.

References in other media
 The song was the focus of a popular sketch from Harry Enfield and Chums, centring on the characters Lee and Lance.
 On an episode of The Simpsons ("Smart and Smarter" from season 15), the song starts while Lisa is trying to change personality in front of her friends.

References

External links

1983 songs
1983 singles
Eurythmics songs
RCA Records singles
Songs written by Annie Lennox
Songs written by David A. Stewart
Song recordings produced by Dave Stewart (musician and producer)
Songs about cross-dressing
The Flying Pickets songs